Nizhny Novgorod State University of Architecture and Civil Engineering is a public university located in Nizhny Novgorod, Russia. It was founded in 1930.

History
Nizhny Novgorod State University of Architecture and Civil Engineering was founded in 1930 as the Nizhny Novgorod Institute of Civil Engineering. The university was formed on the basis of the Faculty of Engineering and Construction of Nizhny Novgorod State University during the division of NSU into six specialized institutes. In 1932 the institute was renamed as Gorky Civil Engineering Institute, which in 1938 was named after V. P. Chkalov.

In 1932 the first graduation in the history of the Institute took place - 32 students, who had come to the higher school from the Novosibirsk State University in 1930, received their civil engineer diplomas, and in 1935 the first intake of 213 engineers to the institute was carried out. During the first decade the institute trained more than 1000 specialists.

The World War II period slowed down, but did not stop the development of the institute. During the war there were 374 specialists graduated. In 1944 it was opened a new specialty - Hydraulic engineering construction of river structures and hydroelectric power plants. Since 1950s the institute developed the activities of student construction teams. Student design bureau was formed at the institute.

After the war the institute started to open new specialties - Urban building (1961), Production of building products and constructions (1962), Natural and waste water treatment (1965), Architecture (1966), Highways (1970).

From 1985 to 2005, 39 scientists of the university became doctors of sciences.

In the 1990s, the university underwent reorganization changes. In 1993, the institute was given the status of academy, and in 1997 - the status of a university. Since that time the university has retained the name: Nizhny Novgorod State University of Architecture and Civil Engineering (NNGASU).

By the early 2020s a wide profile university, implementing a range of basic educational programs in 14 enlarged groups. At the same time, the architectural and construction branch of training remains dominant in terms of the number of students. During 90 years of existence the university has trained over 80 thousand specialists, 12 thousand bachelors and more than 1 thousand masters.

The modern structure of the university includes 2 institutes, 5 faculties, 59 departments. At university there are 22 scientific and pedagogical schools, uniting more than 100 directions in 13 branches of science. In 2006 the university founded the "Privolzhsky scientific journal".

Structure
 General Engineering Faculty
 Faculty of Engineering and Construction
 Faculty of Engineering and Environmental Systems and Constructions 
 Faculty of Architecture and Design
 Faculty of Continuing Education
 Institute of Business Technology
 Intersectoral Institute of Professional Development and Retraining
 Center for pre-university training and education of foreign citizens

Notes and references

Universities in Volga Region
Engineering universities and colleges in Russia
Buildings and structures in Nizhny Novgorod
Public universities and colleges in Russia